The Explosive Ordnance Disposal (EOD)  Centre of Excellence  (EOD CоE) is one of NATO Centres of Excellence, located in Trenčín, Slovakia. It assists NATO member countries, partners, other countries and international organizations, in order to enhance EOD capabilities.

EOD CoE was fully accredited in 2011.

EOD CoE activities with NATO are coordinated through HQ Allied Command Transformation.

See also 

 Allied Command Transformation
 NATO Mountain Warfare Centre of Excellence
 Bomb disposal
 Bomb suit
 TEDAX are the Spanish organization that organizes the personnel trained in bomb disposal.
 52nd Ordnance Group (EOD)
 Advanced Bomb Suit
 Anti-handling device
 Clearance diver
 Demining
 Explosive Ordnance Disposal Badge
 Fuse (explosives)
 Gegana a special police unit of Indonesia specializing in the field of bomb disposal in the country.
 Navy EOD
 Counter-IED efforts
 Overpressure

References

External links 
  Official Webpage
   3rd Integration of the Exoskeleton in the Battlefield Workshop, Prague, Czech Republic

NATO agencies